NEMA wattage labels are used on street lighting fixtures to indicate the wattage of the lamp for maintenance purposes, with various colors showing what type the lamp uses.

Yellow sticker indicates the lamp is a sodium vapor lamp (HPS/LPS). Blue sticker indicates the lamp is mercury vapor (MV). Red sticker indicates the lamp is metal halide (MH). A sticker that is half-red and half-white indicates a pulse start metal halide lamp (PSMH). Green is also used on HPS units in Canada.

In addition to being colour-coded, newer NEMA stickers also state the lamp type abbreviation in the lower right-hand corner (e.g. HPS).

"3" sticker—35 watts (HPS/LPS)-Somewhat Uncommon
"5" sticker—50/55 watts (HPS/LPS)-Somewhat Uncommon
"7" sticker—70 watts (HPS/PSMH)- Very Common
"9" sticker—90 watts (LPS)-Very Uncommon
"10" sticker—100 watts (MV/HPS/PSMH)-Very Common
"13" sticker—135 watts (LPS)- Common
"15" sticker—150 watts (HPS/PSMH)-Very Common
"17" sticker—175 watts (MH/MV)-Common
"18" sticker—180 watts (LPS)-Common
"20" sticker—200 watts (HPS)-Common
"25" sticker—250 watts (MV/MH/HPS/PSMH)-Very Common
"31" sticker—310 watts (HPS)- Very Uncommon
"32" sticker—320 watts (PSMH)- Very Uncommon
"35" sticker—350 watts (PSMH)- Very Uncommon
"40" sticker—400 watts (MV/MH/HPS/PSMH)-Very Common
 "No" sticker-600 watts (MH/HPS)-Lamps for commercial or industrial lighting are so rare that there isn’t any NEMA sticker. Most 600 watt HPS lamps are used for growing.
"70" sticker—700 watts (MV)- Very Uncommon
"75" sticker—750 watts (HPS/PSMH)-Uncommon
"X1" sticker—1,000 watts (MV/HPS/MH/PSMH)- Very Common
"X5" sticker—1,500 watts (MH)- Very Common in stadium lights(HPS)-Uncommon. More used for growing.
No sticker for 2,000 watts (MH)- Mainly Uncommon. There’s 2,000 metal halide lamps in large stadiums.

A label with a PS before the MH (i.e. 17 PSMH) on a MH sticker indicates that the fixture utilizes the newer pulse start technology, which use different lamps than the older probe start technology.

References

External links
Solar Street Light

Street lighting
Stickers